Tephrosia pondoensis (pondo poison pea) is a species of plant in the family Fabaceae. It is found only in South Africa, where it is protected under the National Forest Act (Act 84) of 1998. The pondo poison pea is threatened by habitat loss.

References

pondoensis
Endemic flora of South Africa
Protected trees of South Africa
Vulnerable flora of Africa
Taxonomy articles created by Polbot